The McDermitt Caldera is a large, oval-shaped caldera west of McDermitt in southeastern Oregon and northern Nevada in the United States. The western part of the caldera is in the Trout Creek Mountains, and the northern part is in the Oregon Canyon Mountains.

McDermitt Caldera is possibly the oldest of a sequence of calderas formed by the Yellowstone hotspot. The caldera was preceded by a lava dome that had been built by volcanic eruptions of rhyolite starting about 19 million years ago. This lava dome collapsed into a caldera in an eruption between 16.37 and 16.41 million years ago. A lake subsequently formed in the caldera, and it deposited varved sediments, diatomite, opal, carbonaceous material, and mafic lavas.

Significant ore deposits are buried in the caldera, including mercury and uranium, which were mined at more than eight sites in the caldera during the 20th century. Mercury at these mines was extracted in large amounts, and it came mostly from cinnabar. The McDermitt Mine, located on the eastern edge of the caldera in Nevada, was the last active mercury mine in the United States before it shut down in 1992. Uranium was discovered in the caldera in 1953, and it was extracted mainly from a rhyolite brecciated fault zone at the Moonlight mine on the caldera's southwestern edge. The uranium ore minerals include uraninite and coffinite. The age of the uranium formation is assumed to be the same as the caldera tuff, which is approximately 16.1 million years. Other deposits in the caldera contain ores of antimony, cesium, and lithium.  The Thacker Pass lithium deposit, located within the caldera, is a prospect that in 2017 was said to be the most significant lithium-clay resource in the U.S.

See also
Basin and Range Province

References

External link

Calderas of Nevada
Calderas of Oregon
Extinct volcanoes
Landforms of Harney County, Oregon
Landforms of Humboldt County, Nevada
Landforms of Malheur County, Oregon
Landforms of the Great Basin
Miocene calderas
VEI-7 volcanoes
Volcanoes of Nevada
Volcanoes of Oregon
Yellowstone hotspot